Family Relations is a peer-reviewed academic journal published by Wiley-Blackwell on behalf of the National Council on Family Relations. It covers applied research on family studies and social work. The journal was established in 1952 as The Coordinator, renamed The Family Life Coordinator in 1960, and renamed again in 1970 to The Family Coordinator before obtaining its current title in 1980.

Editors
The following persons are or have been editors-in-chief of the journal:

Abstracting and indexing
The journal is abstracted and indexed in:
EBSCO databases
Current Contents/Social & Behavioral Sciences
InfoTrac
ProQuest databases
Social Sciences Citation Index
VINITI Database RAS
According to the Journal Citation Reports, the journal has a 2016 impact factor of 1.426.

References

External links

National Council on Family Relations

Family therapy journals
English-language journals
Wiley-Blackwell academic journals
Publications established in 1952
5 times per year journals